Analitik is a programming language, developed in 1968 at the Institute of Cybernetics of the Academy of Sciences of the Ukrainian SSR in the USSR. It is a development on the ALMIR-65 language, keeping compatibility with it.

Distinctive features of the language are abstract data types, calculations in arbitrary algebras, and analytic transformations.

It was implemented on MIR-2 machines.

Later, a version of Analitik-74 was developed, implemented on MIR-3 machines.

At the moment, the language exists as a computer algebra system, Analitik-2010, which is being developed jointly by the Institute of Mathematical Machines and Systems of the National Academy of Sciences of Ukraine and the Poltava National Technical University.

References

Programming languages
Computing in the Soviet Union